Øivind Josef Holmsen (28 April 1912 – 23 August 1996) was a Norwegian international footballer. He played left back for Lyn and the 1936 Olympic bronze team. He also played in the 1938 FIFA World Cup, and got 36 caps in total.

References

External links 
 

1912 births
1996 deaths
Norwegian footballers
Norway international footballers
Footballers at the 1936 Summer Olympics
Olympic footballers of Norway
Olympic bronze medalists for Norway
1938 FIFA World Cup players
Lyn Fotball players
Olympic medalists in football
Medalists at the 1936 Summer Olympics
Association football defenders